Funky Miracle is a compilation album from the funk group The Meters on the Charly Records label, containing re-issued material mainly from their first three albums with Josie Records: The Meters (1969), Look-Ka Py Py (1969) and Struttin' (1970). In fact, 35 of the 36 tracks from these albums are present on Funky Miracle with only "Wichita Lineman" from Struttin' missing.

Track listing
Track list adapted from Discogs.

Personnel
Credits adapted from AllMusic.

Primary artist
Ziggy Modeliste – drums, vocals
Art Neville – keyboards, vocals
Leo Nocentelli – guitar, background vocals
George Porter Jr. – bass, background vocals

References

1991 compilation albums
The Meters albums
Albums produced by Allen Toussaint